The Dusit Thani Manila is a hotel in Makati, Metro Manila, Philippines.

History 
Dusit Thani Manila opened as the Manila Garden Hotel with 511 rooms and was among the hotels which opened in Metro Manila in the 1970s in the lead up to the metropolis' hosting of the 1976 International Monetary Fund–World Bank. The hotel building was completed in 1976. The hotel is positioned directly in the center of Makati. It has a unique design and is shaped like a "Y". The hotel has been compared to the Disney Contemporary Resort in Orlando, Florida for having a similar facade. They are well known in Manila for their cuisine and Filipino dishes.

The hotel which was formerly known as the Dusit Hotel Nikko Manila used to be co-operated by Hotel Nikko.

Awards 

 Benjarong named among Top 20 Restaurants by T. Dining Best Restaurants Guide by Philippine Tatler
 World Luxury Travel Awards 2019

See also 
 List of hotels in the Philippines

References

External links 

 Official website

Hotels in Metro Manila
Dusit International
Buildings and structures in Makati